= Strophius (spider) =

Scientific classification
- Domain: Eukaryota
- Kingdom: Animalia
- Phylum: Arthropoda
- Subphylum: Chelicerata
- Class: Arachnida
- Order: Araneae
- Infraorder: Araneomorphae
- Family: Thomisidae
- Genus: Strophius; Keyserling, 1880

Type species
- S. nigricans Keyserling, 1880

Species
- 7, see text

Genus of spiders

Strophius is a genus of crab spiders first described by Eugen von Keyserling in 1880.

== Species ==
As of April 2019 it contains seven species:

- Strophius albofasciatus Mello-Leitão, 1929 — Brazil
- Strophius fidelis Mello-Leitão, 1929 — Brazil
- Strophius hirsutus O. Pickard-Cambridge, 1891 — Costa Rica, Panama
- Strophius levyi Soares, 1943 — Brazil
- Strophius mendax Mello-Leitão, 1929 — Brazil
- Strophius nigricans Keyserling, 1880 — Trinidad, Peru, Brazil, Paraguay
- Strophius signatus O. Pickard-Cambridge, 1892 — Mexico, Guatemala, Brazil
